The 2018 6 Hours of Fuji was an endurance sports car racing event held at the Fuji Speedway in Oyama, Japan on the 12–14 October 2018.
Fuji served as the fourth round of the 2018-19 FIA World Endurance Championship, and was the seventh running of the event as part of the championship. The race was won by the #7 Toyota TS050 Hybrid.

Qualifying

Qualifying Results
Pole position winners in each class are marked in bold.

 - All of José María López's lap times were deleted for speeding in the pit lane, resulting in only one driver of the No. 7 Toyota Gazoo Racing being classified as setting a lap time

Race

Race Result
The minimum number of laps for classification (70% of the overall winning car's race distance) was 161 laps. Class winners in bold.

Standings after the race

2018–2019 LMP World Endurance Drivers' Championship

2018–2019 LMP1 World Endurance Championship

 Note: Only the top five positions are included for the Drivers' Championship standings.

2018–2019 World Endurance GTE Drivers' Championship

2018–2019 World Endurance GTE Manufacturers' Championship

 Note: Only the top five positions are included for the Drivers' Championship standings.

References

External links
 

Fuji
Fuji
6 Hours of Fuji
October 2018 sports events in Japan